Răzvan Riviș (born 17 January 1989 in Arad) is a Romanian football player, currently under contract with UTA Arad.

External links
 Romanian Soccer Profile

1989 births
Living people
Romanian footballers
FC Politehnica Timișoara players
Association football midfielders
Sportspeople from Arad, Romania